Group E was one of eight groups at the 1998 FIFA World Cup into which the 32 teams were divided. Mexico and the Netherlands qualified after they both beat South Korea and drew with Belgium before drawing with each other. The Netherlands' five goals against South Korea put them top on goal difference. Belgium could have qualified with a big win in their final game against South Korea, who were already out, but they only managed a draw and were eliminated.

Standings

Netherlands advanced to play Yugoslavia (runner-up of Group F) in the round of 16.
Mexico advanced to play Germany (winner of Group F) in the round of 16.

Matches

South Korea vs Mexico

Netherlands vs Belgium

Belgium vs Mexico

Netherlands vs South Korea

Netherlands vs Mexico

Belgium vs South Korea

Group E
Group
Group
Belgium at the 1998 FIFA World Cup
South Korea at the 1998 FIFA World Cup